Jiujiang Lushan Airport  is an airport serving Jiujiang, a city in the province of Jiangxi in China. The airport began operations on June 18, 1998. All flights from the airport were suspended on March 21, 2015. The airport reopened on October 31, 2021.

Facilities

Airlines and destinations

See also
List of airports in China

References

Airports in Jiangxi
Jiujiang